The 1983 Palestine Cup of Nations for Youth was the 1st edition of the Palestine Cup of Nations for Youth, it was held in Casablanca, Morocco. The tournament concerned youth teams of the Arab world. Iraq won this first edition beating Saudi Arabia in the final.

Participated teams
The participated teams are:

Withrawal teams:

Squads

Venues

First group stage

Group A

Group B

Group C

Group D

Second group stage

Group A

Group B

Seventh Place Match

Fifth Place Match

Third Place Match

Final

External links
Palestine Youth Cup 1983 - rsssf.com

1983
1983
1983 in Moroccan sport
1983 in African football
1983 in Asian football